Rendezvous with the Future is a 2022 television series commissioned by Bilibili and produced by BBC Studios which explores the science behind the science fiction of the award-winning writer Liu Cixin. The series premiered in China on 16 November 2022 and has been watched by an audience of more than 50 million.

The series comprises three 50-minute episodes, each focusing on a particular theme from Mr Liu’s science fiction.

Episodes

1. First Contact 
"Contact with an alien civilisation has many possibilities. It might have a good outcome. Equally it might have terrible consequences. Any child knows not to open the door to strangers. They know not to greet strangers casually. This is a matter of common sense." — Liu CixinIn this episode, Liu Cixin explores the different possibilities for how first contact with an alien civilisation might happen.

The programme begins with the dilemma posed in Liu Cixin's novel The Three-Body Problem: if humanity receives a message from an extraterrestrial civilisation, should we reply? For the fictional character Ye Wenjie, the answer is 'yes' and Douglas Vakoch who is the President of METI International shares the same view. His organisation creates and transmits interstellar messages in an attempt to communicate with extraterrestrial civilisations. At the EISCAT facility in Norway, he explains how a radar transmitter that is used to study Earth's ionosphere could be repurposed to broadcast a reply. The message could be similar in design to those that humanity has already transmitted into space such as the historic Arecibo Message.

So far the search for extraterrestrial intelligence has focused on electromagnetic signals in radio or microwave frequencies since this is the form of interstellar communication that human civilisation first became capable of. Astronomer Frank Drake describes Project Ozma in which in 1960 he used the newly constructed 85-foot Howard E. Tatel telescope at the National Radio Astronomy Observatory in Green Bank to search for possible radio transmissions from two star systems Epsilon Eridani and Tau Ceti. Referenced in The Three-Body Problem, Project Ozma is generally recognised as humanity's first attempt to detect interstellar radio transmissions.

The search for radio signals is more than 60 years old, but only a tiny fraction of the Milky Way galaxy has been surveyed. It has been likened to having searched a drinking glass's worth of seawater for evidence of fish in all of Earth's oceans.

In 2016, the National Astronomical Observatories of Chinese Academy of Sciences announced that the Five-hundred-meter Aperture Spherical Telescope which is the largest filled-aperture radio telescope in the world was joining forces in a global collaboration with Breakthrough Listen which, to date, is the most comprehensive search for radio signals. Astronomer Li Di describes the background to the construction of FAST and explains the different approaches they are taking for SETI. Li himself is Principal Investigator of the Commensal Radio Astronomy FasT Survey - a multipurpose 'drift-scan' survey of the sky which will use 500 hours of telescope time per year and will take approximately 10 years to complete. FAST is also being used to conduct bespoke searches of nearby star systems with exoplanets identified by the Transiting Exoplanet Survey Satellite.

Some scientists have argued that the search for communications from extraterrestrial civilisations should expanded beyond radio or microwave frequencies. In 2017, astronomers began searching for optical transmissions in the form of laser pulses. But a bolder suggestion is to search for interstellar communications based on more exotic physics such as gravitational waves or neutrinos. The idea that technologically advanced civilisations might use such forms of interstellar and intergalactic communication was explored by Liu Cixin in his novel The Dark Forest.

Caltech experimental physicist Rana Adhikari describes the first detection of gravitational waves in 2015 using the LIGO and Virgo observatories. The GW150914 signal was generated by the collision of two orbiting black holes. Some scientists have argued that LIGO is already capable of detecting artificially generated gravitational wave radiation.

Adhikari outlines the design of a terrestrial gravitational wave transmitter that could give human civilisation the capability of transmitting a gravitational wave message to nearby stars. Most designs of gravitational wave transmitters that have been proposed are well beyond the scope of envisaged future human technology.

Finally, the episode explores another possibility for first contact - that it does not take the form of a message but rather the detection of alien technology. In 1960, the theoretical physicist Freeman Dyson suggested that SETI should be expanded to include searching for sources of infrared radiation, the signature of hypothesised alien megastructures such as Dyson Spheres. A more dramatic possibility is that alien technology could be discovered within our Solar System.

Astrobiologist Jacob Haqq Misra explains that the surface of Earth is one of the few places in the Solar System that has been almost completely examined at a spatial resolution of less than 1 metre. A number of scientists have argued that the Solar System should be searched for evidence of alien artifacts. Artificial Intelligence could be used to aid the analysis of imagery from existing surveys such as the Lunar Reconnaissance Orbiter and Mars Reconnaissance Orbiter.

Haqq Misra describes the discovery in 2017 of the first interstellar object to be observed travelling into our Solar System. Named 'Oumuamua, its intriguing characteristics prompted some speculation that it might be an alien space probe. But no radio transmissions were detected emanating from the object and further study determined it to be of entirely natural origin.

Astronomer Jill Tarter describes her involvement in drafting one of the first post-detection protocols, establishing principles for what should be done in the event of the detection of extraterrestrial intelligence. The discovery of an apparent signal or alien technology is likely to have a high degree of uncertainty and many factors will impact its potential significance. While no confirmed detection of an extraterrestrial signal has yet been received, there have been several cases in which a cosmic signal was legitimately suspected of being of artificial origin. These include the Ohio State Wow! signal of 1977, the Project Phoenix Soho signal of 1997, and the EQ Pegasi hoax of 1998.

2. Voyage to the Stars 
"I think if humans want to survive, our only choice is to expand our living space in the universe. Like H.G. Wells once said: Human beings will either fill the universe or perish completely. There is no other choice." — Liu CixinIn this second episode, Liu Cixin explores the possibility of interstellar travel and how in the future humankind could settle other star systems.

Scientists such as Stephen Hawking argued that the colonisation of space is necessary to mitigate the risks of human extinction from natural or human-made disasters. If the Dark Forest Hypothesis outlined in Liu Cixin’s novel The Dark Forest is true, then this provides another reason to settle other star systems and ensure the long-term survival of human civilisation.

The programme begins with an interview with Dr Dario Izzo of the European Space Agency's Advanced Concepts Team discussing the mathematical challenge of how to settle the Milky Way. He describes the 10th edition of the Global Trajectory Optimisation Competition in which 73 teams from around the world competed to find the most efficient approach for galactic settlement using future hypothetical technology such as Generation Ships. The winning solution achieved the settlement of approximately 3,100 stars across the galaxy in 90 million years - an extraordinary period by the measure of the history of human civilisation, but relatively short in the context of geologic time scales.

The programme then explores some of the key 'breakthrough' technologies essential for humanity to become an interstellar civilisation - many of which are referenced in Liu Cixin’s novel The Dark Forest.

Physicist Bradley Edwards describes the concept of the space elevator - an elevator system that could transport material from the surface of Earth into geostationary orbit at a far cheaper cost than conventional chemical rockets. Edwards argues that the main the reason that humankind has not yet built vast structures in Earth orbit is economic. The construction of the International Space Station is estimated to have cost $150 billion (in 2010 dollars) since it relied on chemical rockets. If humankind's first interstellar spaceship is constructed in Earth orbit, then a space elevator could play a crucial role in transporting materials for its construction at a more affordable cost.

A second significant obstacle to human interstellar travel is the design of the spaceship's Life-Support System. Unlike the International Space Station which receives regular deliveries of supplies, an interstellar spaceship travelling through deep space will need to be an entirely closed system able to sustain its human passengers entirely independent of Earth. Jane Poynter describes how Biosphere 2 was an attempt to create such a closed system, by duplicating many of Earth's natural processes. In the medium term, biosphere technology could find an application in future human settlements on the Moon and Mars.

A third major 'breakthrough' technology required for interstellar travel is nuclear fusion. At the ITER fusion experiment in Southern France, physicist Mark Henderson argues that harnessing the “power of the stars” could open up new opportunities for space propulsion.

There are many different approaches to achieving nuclear fusion. The ITER experiment is based on the tokamak design. But at the Princeton Plasma Physics Laboratory, engineer Stephanie Thomas and plasma physicist Samuel Cohen are testing an early prototype of the Direct Fusion Drive experiment. With this design the nuclear fusion can be used to directly produce thrust for the spacecraft. The Fusion Drive is referenced in Liu Cixin's novel Death's End.

Finally, the programme explores the challenge of how a human crew can survive a voyage that will last well beyond the normal human lifespan. One proposed solution is that it is not the original crew that reaches the destination, but their descendants. This is the concept of the Generation Ship - a ship that carries generations upon generations of humans that live and die onboard the vessel. Liu Cixin references this in his celebrated fictional 'Letter to My Daughter' which was originally published in 2013 on International Children's Day.

Another proposed solution is demonstrated by the fictional character wallfacer Luo Ju in Liu Cixin’s novel The Dark Forest. This is the idea of extending the human lifespan through artificial hibernation or suspended animation.

Professor Jon Rittenberger describes the experimental studies he carried out at the Applied Physiology Laboratory at the University of Pittsburgh in which the core body temperature of nine healthy volunteers was lowered by 3 °C to 4 °C for 3 hours with medication used to suppress shivering. The results achieved were consistent with an estimated reduction in metabolic rate of between 20% and 25% - still a long way from the reductions in metabolic rate of 80% to 98% seen in hibernating mammals. It is unclear whether even a 'deep' reduction in the metabolic rate would be sufficient to extend the human lifespan enough for the ultra-long journey of interstellar travel. But no unique factors or genes or neuro-endocrine properties have been identified to suggest that humans do not have the potential for such a physiological state. ‘Shallow’ reductions in the metabolic rate of 20-25% could find an application in interplanetary spaceflight such as a potential future human-crewed mission to Mars.

3. Becoming a Supercivilisation 
"The characteristics of a supercivilisation are that it uses technology to enhance its evolution to become a more powerful species. Second, the energy that a supercivilisation can use must be really huge. Third, it must have gone a long way on this path of understanding the laws of the universe. But a technologically advanced supercivilisation cannot be a civilisation with only ideas. It must have left its own mark on the universe. It must have spread to places of considerable distance." - Liu CixinIn this final episode, Liu Cixin takes viewers on a journey into the far future to explore how humanity might ultimately become a technologically advanced supercivilisation.

In 1964, in a paper concerning the search for extraterrestrial intelligence, the Soviet astronomer Nikolai Kardashev proposed a means of ranking the level of advancement of a civilisation according to the amount of energy it can access. A Type I civilisation is able to utilise the energy of all the starlight falling on its planet; a Type II civilisation can utilise the entire energy of its star; and a Type III civilisation can utilise the entire energy of all the stars in its entire galaxy. According to Kardashev’s ranking, humanity is currently a Type 0 civilisation.

Mathematician and philosopher Stuart Armstrong of the University of Oxford’s Future of Humanity Institute discusses how humanity could become a Type II supercivilisation through the construction of a Dyson Sphere around the Sun. The concept of surrounding a star with orbiting solar collectors to capture its energy was outlined in a paper published in 1960 by theoretical physicist Freeman Dyson. But Dyson acknowledged that the original inspiration came from the science fiction writer Olaf Stapledon's novel Star Maker. Armstrong suggests that sufficient material for a Dyson Sphere around the Sun could be obtained by disassembling Mercury. And with the use of AI-assisted technology and a 'recursive manufacturing loop', he estimates that its construction could be completed within approximately 30 years.

Liu Cixin suggests that another attribute of a supercivilisation is that it uses technology to enhance its evolution to become a more powerful species - a concept known as transhumanism. It has been argued that if machine brains surpass human brains, then artificial superintelligence could replace humans as the dominant lifeform on Earth. Liu Cixin speculates that transhumanism could offer a solution to this scenario.

AI researcher Xu Li discusses the path towards the development of artificial superintelligence. In the 2016 match between the South Korean Go player Lee Sedol and an AI called AlphaGo, the AI made an unexpected move in the second game that was initially judged to be a mistake. However, it was later recognised as a move of great beauty and genius demonstrating how AI can offer new insights beyond human thought. Xu argues that AI will play an increasingly important role in scientific discovery.

A third criteria Liu Cixin proposes is that a supercivilisation should have made great progress in its scientific understanding of the universe. Currently, one of the greatest mysteries in cosmology concerns the existence of dark matter. Physicist Laura Manenti shows the XENON dark matter experiment which is housed in the largest underground lab in the world at the Laboratori Nazionali del Gran Sasso in Italy. Even grander experiments may be required to make the breakthroughs necessary to understand the universe.

Particle physicist James Beacham discusses the idea of building a particle accelerator on the moon spanning its entire 10,900 km circumference. Yet even a future particle accelerator of such scale would not be sufficient to test the ultimate theories of physics. Liu Cixin's science fiction novel Death's End describes the possibility of a circumsolar particle accelerator which is so powerful that it creates microscopic black holes. Beacham speculates how such an experiment might be realised in practice and whether it could ultimately reach the Holy Grail of particle physics - the Planck Energy.

Liu Cixin's final criteria of a supercivilisation is that it must have spread to places of considerable distance in the universe. To achieve fast interstellar travel or even the possibility of intergalactic travel will require the development of exotic new propulsion technologies and potentially the discovery of new physics. Liu Cixin's science fiction novel Death's End features the idea of 'curvature propulsion' which may be related to the Alcubierre drive proposed in 1994 by theoretical physicist Miguel Alcubierre. Physicist and historian James Woodward describes an alternative idea based on using the principle of inertia to generate thrust - through the hypothesied 'Mach Effect'. Woodward has received funding from NASA's Innovative Advanced Concepts to research his highly speculative Mach Effect Gravity Assist (MEGA) drive which he believes could be a route to 'fast' interstellar travel. Woodward suggests that the same physics that underpins the MEGA drive could open up the possibility for the artificial creation of wormholes. Wormholes are consistent with the general theory of relativity, but whether wormholes actually exist remains to be seen.

References 

Television series
Television series by BBC Studios